Ben Miller is an American football coach and former player who is serving as the special teams coordinator and tight ends coach for Illinois. Prior to being hired at Illinois, he was the special teams coordinator for his alma mater Air Force.

Playing career
At Air Force starting at left tackle his junior and senior years. Miller was elected as an all-conference offensive lineman for the Falcons. After completing active service for the Air Force and being made a reserve, Miller signed a contract with the Cleveland Browns where he was used as a fullback/tight end/long snapper/H-back. During his. During the NFL offseason, he worked as a public affairs officer for the Air Force recruiting and working in public relations. In the fall of 2005, he joined the practice squad for the Philadelphia Eagles after a stint in NFL Europe in Hamburg.

Coaching career
While on active service in the Air Force, Miller began his coaching career serving as a graduate assistant at the Air Force Academy. After retiring from his playing his career, Miller became a graduate assistant at Illinois in 2006. In 2007 he returned to his alma mater as the team's tight ends coach. In 2008 he was given the additional responsibility of coaching specialist. In 2012 he was named Air Forces’ special teams coordinator and running backs coach a position he held until the end of the 2020 season. In 2021 Miller returned to Illinois this time as the team's special teams coordinator and tight ends coach under Bret Bielema.

Personal life
Miller is married to Meghan Carney. The couple has three children. 
It was announced in 2022 that Miller was fighting cancer.

References

Living people
Air Force Falcons football coaches
Air Force Falcons football players
American football fullbacks
American football offensive linemen
American football long snappers
American football tight ends
Cleveland Browns players
Illinois Fighting Illini football coaches
Philadelphia Eagles players
United States Air Force Academy alumni
United States Air Force airmen
Year of birth missing (living people)